Lucas Alberto Pereira da Silva (born 16 June 1992), simply known as Lucas Mineiro, is a Brazilian professional footballer who plays as a central midfielder for Tombense Futebol Clube.

Career
Born in Montes Claros, Brazil, Lucas Mineiro is product of Vitória youth ranks. On 23 July 2014, Lucas Mineiro started his first experience abroad, joining Académica on a two-year deal.

He made his debut for Académica at 10 January 2015, in a 2-2 draw against Paços de Ferreira, scoring the 2-1. On 4 August 2015, Mineiro terminated his contract with Académica.

References

1992 births
Living people
Brazilian footballers
Association football defenders
Primeira Liga players
Esporte Clube Vitória players
Ceará Sporting Club players
Associação Académica de Coimbra – O.A.F. players
Brazilian expatriate footballers
Brazilian expatriate sportspeople in Portugal
Expatriate footballers in Portugal